Serge Gavronsky (born 1932) is an American poet and translator.

Life
Gavronsky was born in Paris. He fled Nazi-occupied France in 1940. Gavronsky received his A.B. in European History and French in 1954 from Columbia College and an M.A. in European History in 1955 and a Ph.D  in European Intellectual History in 1965 from Columbia University, and is now professor emeritus in the French department at Barnard College.  He lives in New York City.

Gavronsky is currently working on his sixth novel and in the process of co-translating, with François Dominique, writer, the majestic poem  "A" by Louis Zukofsky.

Awards
 1979 Guggenheim Fellowship
 1980 Camargo Foundation Fellowship
 1990 Sole judge appointed by the Academy of American Poets for the Harold Morton Landon Prize in Translation 
 1991 French Government, Chevalier dans l'Ordre des Palmes Académiques
 1997 French Government, Officier dans l'Ordre des Arts et des Lettres

Works

Novels
 The German Friend, a novel  (New York, SUN, 1984.)
 The Name of the Father, a novel (Spiralli, 1993) Translated into Italian with a preface by Harold Bloom.
 L'Identita, a novel, a novel (Spiralli, 2006.) Translated into Italian. 
 The Sudden Death of…, a novel (NY: Spuyten Duyvil, 2009.)
 Silence of Memory, a novel (Spuyten Duyvil, 2014.)

Poetry
Books of Poetry:
 AndOrThe: Poems Within a Poem (Talisman House, 2007)

Gavronsky has appeared in over thirty French and American poetry magazines including:
 Lectures et compte-rendu, poèmes. Coll. "Textes," Flammarion, 1973.
 Je le suis, poème, illustrations by Michel Kanter, artists’s edition, 1995.
 L’interminable discussion, poem with six original woodcuts by JM. Scanreigh. Editions Philippe Millereau, 1996.
 Reduction du tryptique, poem with 4 original woodcuts by JM. Scanreigh, Philippe Millereau, 1996.
 Il était un dire, poem for artist's book by Patricia Erbelding (Mémoires Collections, 2007)

Translation
A selection of books in translation:
 
 
 Serge Gavronsky, Francis Ponge: The Power of Language. (1979). University of California Press.
 Le mecanisme du sens (Paris: Maeght, 1979). 
 Joyce Mansour, Cris/Screams, trans. with an Introduction by Serge Gavronsky (Sausolito, CA: Post-Apollo Press, 1995.)
 
 
 Translator and author of introduction, Joyce Mansour Essential Poetry and Prose (Boston: Black Widow Press, 2008.)
 Co-Translator with François Dominique, writer, "Louis Zukofsky’s “A” – 13 - 18 (Dijon: Virgile, 2012).
 Co-Translator with François Dominique, "Louis Zukofsky’s “A” – 19 - 23 (Dijon: Virgile, 2014).

A selection of anthologized poems in translation:
 Jean Follain, Modern European Poetry, Bantam Classics, 1967.
 René Depestre, The World, Special Translation Issue, 1973.
 Aragon, For Neruda/For Chile, Beacon, 1975.
 Francis Ponge, Contemporary World Poetry, Harcourt, Brace, Jovanovich, 1979.
 Marcelin Pleynet, André Frénaud, Francis Ponge, Random House Anthology of Twentieth-Century French Poetry, 1982.
 Monique Buri, The Defiant Muse, French Feminist Poems from the Middle Ages to the Present, The Feminist Press, 1986.
 Jean Frémon, Denis Roche and Marcelin Pleynet in Violence of the White Page: Contempo-rary French Poetry, Tyuonyi, 1992.
 Francis Ponge, Against Forgetting, Twentieth-Century Poetry of Witness,  Norton, 1993.
 Francis Ponge, "The Sun...," Poems for the Millenium, The University of California Press, I, 1995.
 Francis Ponge, "Rhetoric," World Poetry,  Norton, 1998.
 Francis Ponge, “The Object is Poetics,” in Mary Ann Caws, ed. Manifesto: A Century of Isms, Nebraska University Press, 2001.

Criticism
 The French Liberal Opposition and the American Civil War.  (New York, The Humanities Press, 1968.)
 Francis Ponge and the Power of Language.  (Berkeley, California, The University of California Press, 1979.)
 Culture/Ecriture, essais critiques.  (Rome, Bulzoni, 1983.)
 
 
 Towards a New Poetics (Berkeley, California, The University of California Press, 1994.)

References

1932 births
Living people
American male poets
American male novelists
People who emigrated to escape Nazism
Columbia College (New York) alumni
Barnard College faculty
French–English translators
20th-century American novelists
21st-century American novelists
20th-century translators
20th-century American male writers
21st-century American male writers
Novelists from New York (state)
French emigrants to the United States